Tariq is an Arabic word and given name.

Etymology
The word is derived from the Arabic verb ,, meaning "to strike", and into the agentive conjugated doer form ,, meaning "striker". It became popular as a name after Tariq ibn Ziyad, a Muslim military leader who conquered Iberia in the Battle of Guadalete in 711 AD.

In literature and placenames
Ṭariq is used in classical Arabic to refer to a visitor at night (a visitor "strikes" the house door). Due to the heat of travel in the Arabian Peninsula, visitors would generally arrive at night.

The use of the word appears in several places including the Quran, where ṭāriq is used to refer to the brilliant star at night, because it comes out visiting at night, and this is the common understanding of the word nowadays due to the Qur'an.

It can also be found in many poems. For example, from the famous poets Imru' al-Qais and Jarir ibn Atiyah.

Gibraltar is the Spanish derivation of the Arabic name Jabal Aṭtāriq (جبل طارق), meaning "Mountain of Tariq".

Given name

Tarek
 Tarec Saffiedine, Belgian martial artist 
 Tarééc, German singer of Lebanese-Palestinian origin (real name Tarek Hussein) 
 Tarek Al Ali (born 1986), Lebanese footballer
 Tarek Al Eryan (born 1963), Palestinian-American film director
 Tarek Al-Wazir (born 1971), German politician
 Tarek Ali Abdullah Ahmed Baada (born 1976), Yemeni extrajudicial prisoner of the United States
 Tarek Ali Hassan (born 1937), Egyptian writer
 Tarek Amer (born 1989), Egyptian footballer
 Tarek bin Laden (born 1947), Saudi Arabian businessperson
 Tarek Boukensa (born 1981), Algerian runner
 Tarek Boudali (born 1979), Moroccan French actor and director
 Tarek Dergoul (born 1977), British extrajudicial prisoner of the United States
 Tarek El-Said (born 1978), Egyptian footballer
 Tarek El-Telmissany (born 1950), Egyptian cinematographer
 Tarek Elrich (born 1987), Australian soccer player
 Tarek Elsetouhi, Egyptian bodybuilder
 Tarek Fatah (born 1949), Canadian political activist
 Tarek Hadj Adlane (born 1965), Algerian footballer
 Tarek Heggy (born 1950), Egyptian writer
 Tarek Jabban (born 1975), Syrian footballer
 Tarek Kamel, Egyptian politician
 Tarek Lazizi (born 1971), Algerian footballer
 Tarek Mostafa (born 1971), Egyptian footballer
 Tarek Saab, Lebanese-Venezuelan politician
 Tarek Shahin (born 1982), Egyptian cartoonist
 Tarek Shawki (born 1957), Egyptian engineer
 Tarek Thabet (born 1971), Tunisian footballer
 Tarek Wegner, American musician and member of Night Beats
 Tarek Yehia (born 1961), Egyptian footballer
 Tarek El Moussa (born 1982), American TV host

Tarick, Tarık, Tarik
 Tarick Salmaci, American boxer who featured on the TV show The Contender
 Tarık Akan, Turkish film actor
 Tarık Akıltopu, Turkish architect
 Tarik Black, American NBA player
 Tarik Carson, Uruguayan-Argentine writer and painter
 Tarik Cerić, Bosnian footballer
 Tarik Cohen, American football player
 Tarık Daşgün, Turkish footballer
 Tarik Elyounoussi (born 1988), Norwegian footballer
 Tarik Ergin, American actor who played the part of Lieutenant Ayala in Star Trek: Voyager
 Tarik Filipović, Croatian TV presenter and actor of Bosniak descent
 Tarik Glenn, American football player
 Tarik "Rvssian" Johnston, Jamaican music producer
 Tarik O'Regan, British composer living in New York City, USA
 Tarik Phillip (born 1993), British-American basketball player in the Israel Basketball Premier League
 Tarik Samarah, Bosnian photographer who works in artistic and documentary photography
 Tarik Sektioui, Moroccan footballer
 Tarik Sulayman, Muslim Filipino military leader

Tareq, Tariq
Lord Tariq, American rap artist who had collaborations with Peter Gunz
Tareq Abboushi, Palestinian-American musician and composer
Tareq Al-Suwaidan, Kuwaiti intellectual, entrepreneur, Islamic scholar and reformer
Tariq Abdul-Wahad, French NBA basketball player formerly known as Olivier Saint-Jean
Tariq Ali, British-Pakistani writer and film-maker
Tariq Anwar (film editor), Indian-born British-American film editor
Tariq Anwar (politician), Indian politician
Tariq Aziz, former Deputy Prime Minister of Iraq under Saddam Hussein
Tariq Carpenter (born 1998), American football player
Tariq Castro-Fields (born 1999), American football player
Tariq "Corn Kid", American child influencer whose 2022 interview with Recess Therapy was remixed into a song by the Gregory Brothers titled "It's Corn"
Tariq Devega, better known as ASAP Nast, American rapper, songwriter and model
Tariq Hanna, Nigerian-born American pastry chef featured on Food Network
Tariq Hussain (musician), Canadian musician
Tariq Jakobsen, Danish graphic design artist and illustrator
Tariq Lamptey, English footballer
Tariq Jameel, Pakistani Islamic scholar with Tablighi Jamaat
Tariq Masood, Pakistani Islamic scholar
Tariq Nasheed, American internet personality
Tariq Ramadan, Swiss academic and Islamic theologian
Tariq Sims, Australian NRL player
Tariq Spezie, Spanish football player
Tariq Trotter, lead artist from the rap group The Roots
Tariq Woolen (born 1999), American football player
Tariq ibn-Ziyad, one of the Arab conquerors of the Iberian Peninsula in 711

Surname
 Kashmala Tariq, Pakistani politician
 Shahbaz Tariq, Norwegian politician
 Shazia Tariq, Pakistani politician

Fictional characters
Tariq, a character played by Kaysar Miah in the British web series Corner Shop Show
Tarik the Ax Battler, one of the main characters of the Golden Axe video game franchise

See also
 Tariq Aziz (disambiguation)
 Tariq Khan (disambiguation)
 Azam Tariq (disambiguation)

References

Arabic masculine given names
Turkish masculine given names
Arabic-language surnames
Masculine given names
Pakistani masculine given names